Seyrigia is a plant genus, a member of the family Cucurbitaceae, consisting of 6 species (5 accepted).

Species
 Seyrigia bosseri
 Seyrigia gracilis
 Seyrigia humbertii
 Seyrigia marnieri
 Seyrigia multiflora
 Seyrigia napifera

References

Cucurbitoideae
Cucurbitaceae genera